Richonia is a Monotypic genus of fungi in the family Zopfiaceae. It only has 
the one known species of Richonia variospora .

As two other species were later moved, Richonia boudieri  became a synonym of Rechingeriella boudieri and  Richonia duplicispora  is now a synonym of Celtidia duplicispora.

The genus name of Richonia is in honour of Charles Édouard Richon (1820–1893), who was a French Doctor and botanist (Mycology) in the departement of Marne. 

The genus was circumscribed by Jean Louis Emile Boudier in Rev. Mycol. (Toulouse) vol.7 on page 224 in 1885.

References

External links

Pleosporales